Holm is a locality situated in Halmstad Municipality, Halland County, Sweden, with 828 inhabitants in 2020.

Famous resident
 Jonas Axeldal (b. 1970 in Holm), football player

References 

Populated places in Halmstad Municipality